Market is a term used to describe concepts such as:

Market (economics), system in which parties engage in transactions according to supply and demand
Market economy
Marketplace, a physical marketplace or public market

Market(s) or The Market(s) may also refer to:

Geography
Märket, an island shared by Finland and Sweden

Art, entertainment, and media

Films
Market (1965 film), 1965 South Korean film
Market (2003 film), 2003 Hindi film
The Market: A Tale of Trade, a Turkish film

Television
The Market (TV series), a New Zealand television drama
"Markets" (Bluey), an episode of the first season of the animated TV series Bluey

Brands or enterprises
The Market (company), a concept grocery store
The Market, a specialized Safeway store

Types of economic markets
Agricultural marketing
Emerging market
Energy market
Financial market
Foreign exchange market
Grey market, commodity trade outside of original producer's distribution channel
Media market, geographic area with mostly the same set of media outlets
Niche market
Open market, a free trade economy; the antonym of closed market
Prediction market
Real estate market
Stock market
Wholesale marketing

Aspects of economic markets
Efficient-market hypothesis, economic theory that asset prices fully reflect all available information
Mark-to-market accounting
Market capitalization, total value of a public company's outstanding shares
Market failure
Market maker
Market microstructure
Market research
Market segmentation
Market share
Market trend
Market value
Single market
Target market

Types of physical markets
Bazaar
Farmers' market, focusing on fresh food
Fish market
Flea market, for used items
Floating market
Grocery store
Market square
Market town
Marketplace
Night market
Public market (disambiguation)
Supermarket
Wet market, focusing on fresh meat, fish, produce, and other perishable goods

See also

 
Marketplace (disambiguation), a word sometimes interchangeable with "market"
Markt (disambiguation)
Marquette (disambiguation)
Mercado (disambiguation), the Spanish and Portuguese word for market
The Marketts
The Title Market (1909), a book by Emily Post